Kristina M. Johnson (born May 7, 1957) is an American business executive and academic administrator who currently serves as the 16th president of Ohio State University since 2020.

She previously served as the 13th chancellor of the State University of New York from 2017 to 2020. She has knowledge in the development of optoelectronic processing systems, 3-D imaging, and color-management systems.

Early life and education
Johnson was born in St. Louis, Missouri and grew up in Denver, Colorado. As a senior at Thomas Jefferson High School, she won the Denver City and Colorado State science fair competition, and placed second in the Physics division and a first place award from the Air Force at the International Science Fair for her project entitled, "Holographic Study of the Sporangiophore Phycomyces". Johnson grew up in a large, athletic family. She competed in Tae Kwon Do and learned to play lacrosse on the boys' lacrosse team. Her paternal grandfather, Charles W. Johnson, attended the Ohio State University and played football for the Buckeyes in 1896; Johnson would eventually become president there.

As an undergraduate at Stanford University, Johnson founded the women's club lacrosse team (now varsity) and played on the field hockey team, trying out for the U.S. Team in 1978. In 1979, Johnson was diagnosed with Hodgkin's disease and turned her focus to an academic career. Johnson received her B.S., M.S., and Ph.D. degrees in electrical engineering from Stanford, and was a postdoctoral fellow at Trinity College Dublin.

Career
After the postdoctoral fellowship, Johnson was appointed assistant professor of electrical and computer engineering at the University of Colorado Boulder in 1985, where she co-founded the National Science Foundation (NSF) Engineering Research Center (ERC) for Optoelectronic Computing Systems and spun off several companies from her research laboratory including ColorLink, Inc which was later sold to RealD, responsible for the technology that helped re-launch the 3D movie industry. Additionally, she co-founded the Colorado Advanced Technology Institute Center of Excellence in Optoelectronics. In 1999, Johnson was appointed Dean of the School of Engineering at Duke University, which would be later named for distinguished alumnus, Edmund T. Pratt Jr., CEO emeritus of Pfizer Corporation.

In 2007, Johnson became the Senior Vice-President and Provost of Johns Hopkins University. In 2009, Johnson was appointed by President Obama as the Under Secretary of Energy for Energy and Environment at the United States Department of Energy with the unanimous consent of the United States Senate.

She is the founder of Enduring Hydro, a hydropower-focused energy firm. The firm has a joint venture with the New York City-based private equity firm I Squared Capital (called Cube Hydro Partners), that owns and operates 19 hydropower plants in the Eastern United States.

Johnson was elected a member of the National Academy of Engineering in 2016 for the development and deployment of liquid crystal on silicon display technologies, the basis for high-speed optoelectronic 3D imaging.

Johnson has been a director of Minerals Technologies Inc., Nortel, Guidant Corporation, AES Corporation, and Boston Scientific. She is currently a member of the Board of Directors of Cisco Systems. In 2019, she resigned from the board of AES Corporation amid criticism of the company's pollution in Puerto Rico.

In April 2017 Johnson was appointed chancellor of the 64-school State University of New York, assuming the role in September.

On June 3, 2020 it was announced that Johnson would resign from her position at the State University of New York to become the next President of Ohio State University.

On November 28, 2022 Johnson announced that she would be resigning from her position of President of Ohio State University at the end of academic year. The resignation came at the request of the university's board of trustees.

Personal life 
Johnson is married to Veronica Meinhard, Founder and President of Juniper Philanthropy Partners.

Awards and honors

 In 1993, Johnson was the first woman to be awarded the International Dennis Gabor Award for creativity in modern optics. 
In 2003, Johnson was named a Fellow of the IEEE "for contributions to optoelectronic processing systems and liquid crystal devices".
In 2004, Johnson received the Society of Women Engineers Achievement Award, the highest honor of the Society.
 In 2008, she received the John Fritz Medal.
 In 2010, Johnson was the winner of the ABIE Award for Technical Leadership from the Anita Borg Institute.
 In 2014, Johnson was inducted into the Colorado Women's Hall of Fame.
 In 2015, Johnson was elected to the National Inventors Hall of Fame for her work developing polarization-control technologies.
 In 2016, Johnson was elected to the National Academy of Engineering.
 In 2017, Johnson was awarded an honorary doctorate by NUI Galway.
 In 2021, Johnson received the IEEE Mildred Dresselhaus Medal, recognizing outstanding technical contributions in science and engineering of great impact.

References

American electrical engineers
Engineering educators
Stanford University alumni
Duke University faculty
University of Colorado faculty
Living people
Women inventors
Directors of Nortel
American corporate directors
United States Department of Energy officials
John Fritz Medal recipients
Women corporate directors
1957 births
Members of the United States National Academy of Engineering
Johnson
Women heads of universities and colleges
LGBT people from Missouri
Fellow Members of the IEEE
Fellows of Optica (society)
SPIE
Presidents of Ohio State University
Boston Scientific people